Tuff Bluff is a small though prominent light-colored bluff on the northern slopes of Brown Peninsula, Victoria Land. The bluff is significant geologically as a locality for trachytic tuff, from which the feature derives its name. Name applied by the New Zealand Antarctic Place-Names Committee (NZ-APC) following investigations by the New Zealand Geological Survey and Victoria University Expedition in the area, 1964–65.

Cliffs of Victoria Land
Scott Coast